Bergweg is a street in Rotterdam, which connects Rotterdam with Bergschenhoek through Hillegersberg. Nowadays the Bergweg is a road in the neighborhood Oude Noorden between the Schiekade and Gordelweg. The buildings mostly dating from the early twentieth century.

In the street lies the Rotterdam Noord railway station and the closed Bergweg railway station.

Streets in Rotterdam